Acoustic may refer to:

Music

Albums
 Acoustic (Above & Beyond album), 2014
 Acoustic (Deine Lakaien album), 2007
 Acoustic (Everything but the Girl album), 1992
 Acoustic (John Lennon album), 2004
 Acoustic (Love Amongst Ruin album), 2011
 Acoustic (Nitty Gritty Dirt Band album), 1994
 Acoustic (Nouvelle Vague album), 2009
 Acoustic (Simple Minds album), 2016
 The Acoustic by Ektomorf, 2012
 Acoustic by Oumou Sangaré, 2020
 Acoustic Volume 2 by Joey Cape and Tony Sly, 2012

EPs and singles
 Acoustic (Bayside EP), 2006
 Acoustic (Britt Nicole EP), 2010
 Acoustic (Coldplay EP), 2000
 Acoustic (Lights EP), 2010
 Acoustic (Second Coming EP), an acoustic version of 13, 2003
 Acoustic, by Brandi Carlile, 2004
 Acoustic, by Gabrielle Aplin, 2010
 Acoustic, by Press to Meco, 2019
 "Acoustic" (single), "Follow You Home" and "Refugees", by Embrace, 2014

Companies
 Acoustic (magazine)
 Acoustic Guitar (magazine)
 Acoustic Disc, a record label owned by David Grisman
 Acoustic Control Corporation, produced amplifiers

Other music
 Acoustic guitar, as opposed to electric guitar
 Acoustic bass guitar, as opposed to electric bass guitar
 Acoustic music, music that solely or primarily uses non-electrical instruments
 Acoustic recording, a pre-microphone method of recording
 Acoustics, a branch of physics that studies sound
 Musical acoustics, the branch of acoustics that studies the physics of music
 Piano acoustics, the physical properties of the piano that affect its sound

Technology
 Acoustic cryptanalysis, in cryptography, a side channel attack which exploits sounds
 Acoustic fingerprint, a condensed digital summary, a fingerprint generated from an audio signal
 Acoustic location, a pre-radar and pre-sonar method of detecting hostile vehicles and vessels
 Acoustic metamaterials, engineered materials with atypical properties
 Acoustic signature, sound emitters, such as those of ships and submarines
 Acoustic thermometry, observation of ocean climate using long-range instruments
 Acoustic torpedo, a torpedo that aims itself

Other uses
 Acoustic (film), a 2010 South Korean omnibus film
 External acoustic meatus, another name for the ear canal

See also
 Acoustica (disambiguation)
 Acoustics (disambiguation)
 Acoustic EP (disambiguation), various albums
 Acoustic Sessions (disambiguation)